Fenrir Valley is a small, mainly ice-free valley between the upper reaches of Heimdall Glacier and Rhone Glacier in the Asgard Range of Victoria Land, Antarctica. The name, applied by the New Zealand Antarctic Place-Names Committee and the Advisory Committee on Antarctic Names in consultation, is one in a group in the range derived from Norse mythology, wherein Fenrir is a wolf chained by Tīw.

References 

Valleys of Victoria Land
McMurdo Dry Valleys